The following article presents a summary of the 2003 football (soccer) season in Brazil, which was the 102nd season of competitive football in the country.

Campeonato Brasileiro Série A

Cruzeiro declared as the Campeonato Brasileiro champions.

Relegation
The two worst placed teams, which are Fortaleza and Bahia, were relegated to the following year's second level.

Campeonato Brasileiro Série B

Palmeiras declared as the Campeonato Brasileiro Série B champions.

Promotion
The two best placed teams in the final stage of the competition, which are Palmeiras and Botafogo, were promoted to the following year's first level.

Relegation
The two worst placed teams, which are Gama and União São João, were relegated to the following year's third level.

Campeonato Brasileiro Série C

Ituano declared as the Campeonato Brasileiro Série C champions.

Promotion
The two best placed teams in the final stage of the competition, which are Ituano and Santo André, were promoted to the following year's second level.

Copa do Brasil

The Copa do Brasil final was played between Cruzeiro and Flamengo.

Cruzeiro declared as the cup champions by aggregate score of 4-2.

State championship champions

Youth competition champions

Other competition champions

Brazilian clubs in international competitions

Brazil national team
The following table lists all the games played by the Brazil national football team in official competitions and friendly matches during 2003.

Women's football

Brazil women's national football team
The following table lists all the games played by the Brazil women's national football team in official competitions and friendly matches during 2003.

The Brazil women's national football team competed in the following competitions in 2003:

Domestic competition champions

References

 Brazilian competitions at RSSSF
 2003 Brazil national team matches at RSSSF
 2000-2003 Brazil women's national team matches at RSSSF

 
Seasons in Brazilian football
Brazil